Aboyne Hospital is a community hospital in Bellwood Road, Aboyne, Scotland. It is managed by NHS Grampian.

History
The facility, which was designed by Jenkins & Marr, opened as an infectious diseases hospital in 1898. A ward pavilion was added in 1926 and, after the hospital had joined the National Health Service in 1948, a new health centre was added in 1980. A major refurbishment started in 2002 and the newly modernised facilities were opened by the Princess Royal in August 2003.

References

NHS Scotland hospitals
Hospital buildings completed in 1898
1898 establishments in Scotland
Hospitals established in 1898
Hospitals in Aberdeenshire